The International Joint Commission on Allied Health Personnel in Ophthalmology (IJCAHPO) is an American nonprofit professional association for Allied Ophthalmic Personnel (AOP).

Founded in 1969, the IJCAHPO provides certification and education programs for persons in the ophthalmology field.

Certification
IJCAHPO offers core professional certifications;
 Certified Ophthalmic Assistant (COA) – Entry Level
 Certified Ophthalmic Technician (COT) – Intermediate Level
 Certified Ophthalmic Medical Technologist (COMT) – Advanced Level

IJCAHPO specialty certifications include
 Certified Diagnostic Ophthalmic Sonographer (CDOS)
 Registered Ophthalmic Ultrasound Biometrist (ROUB)
 Ophthalmic Surgical Assistant – Surgical Technician (OSA-ST)
 Corporate Certified Ophthalmic Assistant (CCOA)
 Ophthalmic Scribe Certification (OSC)

Education
Annual Meeting - IJCAHPO holds a national Annual Continuing Education (ACE) program with Continuing Education (CE) courses and Learning Labs at the basic, intermediate, advanced, and master levels. The ACE program is held in conjunction with the American Academy of Ophthalmology (AAO) annual meeting.

Regional Meetings - IJCAHPO offers a series of one and two-day continuing education programs in the U.S. and Canada. 

Distance Learning - IJCAHPO offers EyeCareCE, an on-demand e-learning website, featuring a library of courses that offer multiple certification credits. The IJCAHPO Webinar Series are live, online instructor lead courses that allow attendees to directly interact with the presenter and participate in real-time forums.

Tools and Resources - IJCAHPO publishes books, CD lecture packets, examination study materials, Learning Systems Series CDs, Refinements modules, and more.  IJCAHPO also awards CE credits for courses and programs offered by other providers.

Governance
IJCAHPO is managed by a Board of Directors consisting of 17 Directors. An Advisory Councilor is selected from each of the Regular and Affiliate Organizations.

Regular Organizational Council Representatives 
 American Academy of Ophthalmology 
 American Association for Pediatric Ophthalmology and Strabismus
 American Glaucoma Society 
 American Ophthalmological Society 
 American Society of Cataract & Refractive Surgery 
 American Society of Ophthalmic Administrators 
 American Society of Retina Specialists 
 Association of Technical Personnel in Ophthalmology 
 Association of University Professors of Ophthalmology 
 Association of Veterans Affairs Ophthalmologists 
 Canadian Ophthalmological Society 
 Canadian Society of Ophthalmic Medical Personnel

Affiliate Organizational Council Representatives 
 American Association of Certified Orthoptists
 American Orthoptic Council
 Ophthalmic Photographers’ Society 
 Philippine Academy of Ophthalmology 
 The Canadian Orthoptic Society 
 Pan-American Association of Ophthalmology

Websites
JCAHPO Website

Medical associations based in the United States
Ophthalmology organizations
Professional titles and certifications
Medical and health organizations based in Minnesota